Bracewell is a rural locality in the Gladstone Region, Queensland, Australia.

Geography 

The predominant land use is grazing on native vegetation.

History
The Bracewell Public Hall (also known as the Bracewell School of Arts) was opened in January 1914 on Mr Cuthbert's land beside the main road in the town. It was at 1237 Mount Larcom Bracewell Road.

Bracewell State School opened on 5 July 1915 and closed on 30 June 2000. The school was at 1444 Mount Larcom Bracewell Road.

Cedar Vale State School opened on 12 April 1926 and closed on 15 December 1978. It was on a bend in the Mount Larcom Bracewell Road.

In the 2011 census, the population of Bracewell and its neighbour East End was 462 people.

Education 
There are no schools in Bracewell. The nearest government primary schools are Ambrose State School in neighbouring Ambrose to the north and Mount Larcom State School in Mount Larcom to the north-east. The nearest government secondary schools are Mount Larcom State School (to Year 10) in Mount Larcom and Gladstone State High School (to Year 12) in West Gladstone to the east.

See also

 List of schools in Central Queensland

References

Further reading 

  — includes Cedar Vale State School and East End State School

  — also includes closed schools: Bracewell State School, Raglan State School, Cedar Vale State School, East End State School, Hourigan Creek School, Hut Creek School, Langmorn School, Langmorn Creek Crossing School, Machine Creek State School

Gladstone Region
Localities in Queensland